The 1980 United States presidential election in Nevada took place on November 4, 1980. All 50 states and The District of Columbia were part of the 1980 United States presidential election. State voters chose three electors to the Electoral College, who voted for president and vice president.

Nevada was won by Former California Governor Ronald Reagan (R), who won the state with a 36-point landslide.

Starting with this election, the winner of every presidential election won Nevada, until 2016.

Likely owing to criticism of Carter for his inability to understand specifically Western issues, mainly the region's problems with water supply, the 1980 result is the most Republican Nevada has ever been relative to the nation as a whole since statehood.

Primaries

Results

Results by county

See also
United States presidential elections in Nevada

References

Nevada
1980
1980 Nevada elections